Matthew Paige Damon (born October 8, 1970) is an American actor, film producer, and screenwriter. Ranked among Forbes most bankable stars, the films in which he has appeared have collectively earned over $3.88 billion at the North American box office, making him one of the highest-grossing actors of all time. He has received various awards and nominations, including an Academy Award and two Golden Globe Awards, in addition to nominations for three British Academy Film Awards and seven Primetime Emmy Awards.

Damon began his acting career in the film Mystic Pizza (1988). He continued acting in Courage Under Fire (1996) and The Rainmaker (1997). He gained prominence in 1997 when he and Ben Affleck wrote and starred in Good Will Hunting, which won them the Academy and Golden Globe awards for Best Screenplay. He established himself as a leading man by starring as Tom Ripley in The Talented Mr. Ripley (1999), Jason Bourne in the Bourne franchise (2002–2007; 2016), and con man Linus Caldwell in the Ocean's trilogy (2001–2007). Damon's other notable performances were in Saving Private Ryan (1998), Syriana (2005), The Departed (2006), The Informant! (2009), Invictus (2009), True Grit (2010), Contagion (2011), Ford v Ferrari (2019), Stillwater (2021), and The Last Duel (2021). He won the Golden Globe Award for Best Actor for playing an astronaut stranded on Mars in The Martian (2015).

He is also known for his performances in television, including his portrayal as Scott Thorson in the HBO biopic Behind the Candelabra (2013) for which he was nominated for a Primetime Emmy Award. He has guest-starred on 30 Rock in 2011 and Saturday Night Live in 2019. He also produced the reality series Project Greenlight (2001–2015) as well as the film Manchester by the Sea (2016).

Damon has performed voice-over work in both animated and documentary films, and has established two production companies with Affleck. He has been involved in charitable work with organizations including the One Campaign, H2O Africa Foundation, Feeding America, and Water.org.

Early life and education 
Damon was born in Cambridge, Massachusetts on October 8, 1970, the second son of Kent Telfer Damon (1942–2017), a stockbroker, and Nancy Carlsson-Paige (b. 1946), an early childhood education professor at Lesley University. His father had English and Scottish ancestry, while his mother is of Finnish and Swedish descent; her family surname had been changed from Pajari to Paige. Damon and his family moved to Newton for two years. His parents divorced when he was two years old, and he and his brother returned with their mother to Cambridge, where they lived in a six-family communal house. His brother, Kyle, is a sculptor and artist. As a lonely teenager, he has said that he felt he did not belong. Due to his mother's "by the book" approach to child-rearing, he had a hard time defining his own identity.

Damon attended Cambridge Alternative School and Cambridge Rindge and Latin School, where he was a good student. He performed as an actor in several high school theater productions. He credited his drama teacher Gerry Speca as an important artistic influence, though his close friend and schoolmate Ben Affleck got the "biggest roles and longest speeches". He attended Harvard University, where he was a resident of Lowell House and a member of the class of 1992, but left before receiving his degree to take a lead role in the film Geronimo: An American Legend. While at Harvard, Damon wrote an early treatment of the screenplay Good Will Hunting as an exercise for an English class, for which he later received an Academy Award. He was a member of The Delphic Club, one of Harvard's select Final Clubs. He was awarded the Harvard Arts Medal in 2013.

Career

1988–1999: Early work and breakthrough 

Damon entered Harvard in 1988, where he appeared in student theater plays, such as Burn This and A... My Name is Alice. Later, he made his film debut at the age of 18, with a single line of dialogue in the romantic comedy Mystic Pizza. As a student at Harvard, he acted in small roles such as in the TNT original film Rising Son and the ensemble prep-school drama School Ties. He left the university in 1992, a semester (12 credits) shy of completion of his Bachelor of Arts in English to feature in Geronimo: An American Legend in Los Angeles, erroneously expecting the movie to become a big success. Damon next appeared as an opiate-addicted soldier in 1996's Courage Under Fire, for which he lost  in 100 days on a self-prescribed diet and fitness regimen. Courage Under Fire gained him critical notice, when The Washington Post labeled his performance "impressive".

During the early 1990s, Damon and Affleck wrote Good Will Hunting (1997), a screenplay about a young mathematics genius, an extension of a screenplay he wrote for an assignment at Harvard, having integrated advice from director Rob Reiner, screenwriter William Goldman, and writer/director Kevin Smith. He asked Affleck to perform the scenes with him in front of the class and, when Damon later moved into Affleck's Los Angeles apartment, they began working on the script more seriously. The film, which they wrote mainly during improvisation sessions, was set partly in their hometown of Cambridge, and drew from their own experiences. They sold the screenplay to Castle Rock in 1994, but after a conflict with the company, they convinced Miramax to purchase the script. The film received critical praise; Quentin Curtis of The Daily Telegraph found "real wit and vigour, and some depth" in their writing and Emanuel Levy of Variety wrote of Damon's acting, "[he] gives a charismatic performance in a demanding role that's bound to catapult him to stardom. Perfectly cast, he makes the aching, step-by-step transformation of Will realistic and credible." It received nine Academy Awards nominations, including Best Actor for Damon; he and Affleck won the Oscar and Golden Globe Award for Best Screenplay. He and Affleck were each paid salaries of $600,000, while the film grossed over $225 million at the worldwide box office. The two later parodied their roles from the film in Kevin Smith's 2001 movie Jay and Silent Bob Strike Back.

Speaking of his "overnight success" through Good Will Hunting, Damon said by that time he had been working in the cinema for 11 years, but still found the change "nearly indescribable—going from total obscurity to walking down a street in New York and having everybody turn and look". Before the film, Damon played the lead in the critically acclaimed drama The Rainmaker (1997), where he was recognized by the Los Angeles Times as "a talented young actor on the brink of stardom." For the role, Damon regained most of the weight he had lost for Courage Under Fire. After meeting Damon on the set of Good Will Hunting, director Steven Spielberg cast him in the brief title role in the 1998 World War II film Saving Private Ryan. He co-starred with Edward Norton in the 1998 poker film Rounders, where he plays a reformed gambler in law school who must return to playing big stakes poker to help a friend pay off loan sharks. Despite meager earnings at the box-office, it is now considered one of the greatest poker movies of all time.

Damon then portrayed antihero Tom Ripley in The Talented Mr. Ripley (1999), a role for which he lost . Damon said that he wanted to display his character's humanity and honesty on screen despite his criminal actions. An adaptation of Patricia Highsmith's 1955 novel of same name, the film costarred Jude Law, Gwyneth Paltrow, and Cate Blanchett, and received praise from critics. "Damon outstandingly conveys his character's slide from innocent enthusiasm into cold calculation", according to Variety magazine. He played a fallen angel who discusses pop culture as intellectual subject matter with Affleck in Dogma (1999). The film received generally positive reviews, but proved controversial among religious groups who deemed it blasphemous.

2000–2008: Worldwide recognition 
In 2000, along with Ben Affleck and producers Chris Moore and Sean Bailey, Damon founded the production company LivePlanet, through which the four created the Emmy-nominated documentary series Project Greenlight to find and fund worthwhile film projects from novice filmmakers. The company produced and founded the short-lived mystery-hybrid series Push, Nevada, among other projects.

Damon's attempts at leading characters in romantic dramas such as 2000's All the Pretty Horses and The Legend of Bagger Vance were commercially and critically unsuccessful. Variety said of his work in All the Pretty Horses: "[Damon] just doesn't quite seem like a young man who's spent his life amidst the dust and dung of a Texas cattle ranch. Nor does he strike any sparks with [Penelope] Cruz." He was similarly deemed "uncomfortable being the center" of Robert Redford's The Legend of Bagger Vance by Peter Rainer of New York magazine.

During this period, Damon joined two lucrative film series—Ocean's Trilogy (2001–2007) and Bourne (2002–2016)—and produced the television series Project Greenlight (2001–2005, 2015). In the former's first installment, Steven Soderbergh's 2001 ensemble film Ocean's Eleven, which is a remake of the Rat Pack's Ocean's 11 (1960), he co-starred as thief Linus Caldwell. The role was originally meant for Mark Wahlberg, who refused it in favor of other projects. The film was successful at the box-office, grossing $450 million from a budget of $83 million. Damon, alongside Affleck and others, produced the documentary series Project Greenlight, aired on HBO and later Bravo, which helps newcomers develop their first film. The series was nominated for the Primetime Emmy Award for Outstanding Reality Program in 2002, 2004 and 2005. Damon later said that he and Affleck felt proud that the show helped launch the careers of several directors; Damon later served as the executive producer of a number of projects directed by the winners of the show.

Damon began 2002 with writing and starring in Gerry, a drama about two friends who forget to bring water and food when they go hiking in a desert. The reviews for the film were generally positive, but it was a box-office failure. He then played amnesiac assassin Jason Bourne in Doug Liman's action thriller The Bourne Identity (2002). Liman considered several actors for the role, before he cast Damon. Damon insisted on performing many of the stunts himself, undergoing three months of extensive training in stunt work, the use of weapons, boxing, and eskrima. Damon said that before The Bourne Identity he was jobless for six months, and many of his films during that period under-performed at the box-office. He doubted the film's financial prospects, but it proved a commercial success. Reviews for the film were also positive; Roger Ebert praised it for its ability to absorb the viewer in its "spycraft" and "Damon's ability to be focused and sincere". For his role, Entertainment Weekly named Damon among "the decade's best mixer of brawn and brains."

Damon voiced the role of Spirit in the animated film Spirit: Stallion of the Cimarron (2002) and later played a conjoined twin in Stuck on You (2003), which received a mixed critical reception. His major releases in 2004 included starring roles in the sequels The Bourne Supremacy and Ocean's Twelve. Both films earned more than $280 million at the box-office. In a review for The Bourne Supremacy, BBC's Nev Pierce called the film "a brisk, engrossing and intelligent thriller", adding, "Damon is one hell of an action hero. He does a lot with very little, imbuing his limited dialogue with both rage and sorrow, looking harder and more haunted as the picture progresses". For the film, he earned an Empire Award for Best Actor; the award's presenter Empire attributed Damon's win to his "astute, underplayed performance, through which he totally eschews movie star vanity". He played a fictionalized version of Wilhelm Grimm alongside Heath Ledger in Terry Gilliam's fantasy adventure The Brothers Grimm (2005), which was a critically panned commercial failure; The Washington Post concluded, "Damon, constantly flashing his newscaster's teeth and flaunting a fake, 'Masterpiece Theatre' dialect, comes across like someone who got lost on the way to an audition for a high school production of The Pirates of Penzance."

Later in 2005, he appeared as an energy analyst in the geopolitical thriller Syriana alongside George Clooney and Jeffrey Wright. The film focuses on petroleum politics and the global influence of the oil industry. Damon says starring in the film broadened his understanding of the oil industry and that he hoped the people would talk about the film afterward. Peter Travers of Rolling Stone was mainly impressed with Clooney's acting, but also found Damon's performance "whiplash". In 2006, Damon joined Robert De Niro in The Good Shepherd as a career CIA officer, and played an undercover mobster working for the Massachusetts State Police in Martin Scorsese's The Departed, a remake of the Hong Kong police thriller Infernal Affairs. Assessing his work in the two films, Manohla Dargis of The New York Times wrote that Damon has the unique "ability to recede into a film while also being fully present, a recessed intensity, that distinguishes how he holds the screen." The Departed received critical acclaim and won the Academy Award for Best Picture.

According to Forbes in August 2007, Damon was the most bankable star of the actors reviewed, his last three films at that time averaged US$29 at the box office for every dollar he earned. Damon had an uncredited cameo in Francis Ford Coppola's Youth Without Youth (2007) and another cameo in the 2008 Che Guevara biopic Che. While he was working on the Bourne films, Damon declined an offer from James Cameron to star in his upcoming film Avatar, as he did not want to break his Bourne contract. Cameron offered Damon 10% of the profits for the film, which went on to become the most successful of all time. Damon said later: "I will go down in history… you will never meet an actor who turned down more money."

2009–present: Established actor 

He made a guest appearance in 2009 on the sixth-season finale of Entourage as himself, where he tries to pressure Vincent Chase (Adrian Grenier) into donating to his real foundation ONEXONE. His next role was Steven Soderbergh's dark comedy The Informant! (2009), in which his Golden Globe-nominated work was described by Entertainment Weekly as such: "The star – who has quietly and steadily turned into a great Everyman actor – is in nimble control as he reveals his character's deep crazies." Also in 2009, Damon portrayed South Africa national rugby union team captain François Pienaar in the Clint Eastwood-directed film Invictus, which is based on the 2008 John Carlin book Playing the Enemy: Nelson Mandela and the Game That Changed a Nation and features Morgan Freeman as Nelson Mandela. Invictus earned Damon an Academy Award nomination for Best Supporting Actor. The New Republic observed that he brought "it off with low-key charm and integrity." Damon also lent his voice to the English version of the animated film Ponyo, which was released in the United States in August 2009.

In March 2010, Damon and Ben Affleck collaborated once again to create another production company titled Pearl Street Films, a Warner Bros.-based production company. That year, he reunited with director Paul Greengrass, who directed him in the Bourne Supremacy and Bourne Ultimatum, for the action thriller Green Zone, which flopped commercially and received a score of 53% on Rotten Tomatoes and ambivalent reception from critics. He has appeared as a guest star in an episode of Arthur, titled "The Making of Arthur", as himself. During season 5 of 30 Rock, he appeared as a guest star in the role of Liz Lemon's boyfriend in the episodes "I Do Do", "The Fabian Strategy", "Live Show", and "Double-edged Sword". Damon's 2010 projects included Clint Eastwood's Hereafter and the Coen brothers' remake of the 1969 John Wayne-starring Western True Grit.

In 2011, he starred in The Adjustment Bureau, Contagion, and We Bought a Zoo. That same year, the documentary which he narrated, American Teacher, opened in New York prior to national screening. Also in 2011, he voiced a krill named Bill in the animated film Happy Feet Two. In January 2012, it was announced that Damon had signed a multiyear deal to be the voice of TD Ameritrade advertisements, replacing Sam Waterston as the discount brokerage's spokesman. Damon donated all fees from the advertisements to charity. In April 2012, Damon filmed Promised Land, directed by Gus Van Sant, which Damon co-wrote with John Krasinski. Damon's next film with frequent collaborator Steven Soderbergh was Behind the Candelabra, a drama about the life of pianist/entertainer Liberace (played by Michael Douglas) with Damon playing Liberace's longtime partner Scott Thorson. The film premiered on HBO on May 26, 2013.

Damon starred in the science fiction film Elysium (2013), where he played former car-thief-turned-factory-worker Max DeCosta. He also appeared in the science fiction movie The Zero Theorem by Terry Gilliam in 2013. That same year, Damon appeared in a 20-second advertisement for Nespresso, directed by Grant Heslov, with whom he worked on The Monuments Men. The deal earned him $3 million. Damon also provided voice-over for United Airlines's resurrected "Fly the Friendly Skies" advertisement campaign in 2013.

In 2014, he starred in George Clooney's The Monuments Men, and played the minor role of scientist Dr. Mann, in Christopher Nolan's Interstellar. That same year, Damon appeared as a celebrity correspondent for Years of Living Dangerously. In 2015, Damon portrayed the main character, astronaut Mark Watney, in Ridley Scott's The Martian, based on Andy Weir's best-selling novel of the same name, a role that earned him the Golden Globe Award for Best Actor – Motion Picture Musical or Comedy and his second Academy Award nomination for Best Actor. Having not returned for the fourth film in the Bourne film series, Damon reprised his role in 2016's Jason Bourne, reuniting with Paul Greengrass. In 2017, Damon played the lead role in Zhang Yimou's The Great Wall, a hit internationally and a disappointment at the domestic box office. The film, and Damon's casting, were not well received by critics. Later in 2017, he starred in two satires, George Clooney's 1950s-set Suburbicon, which was released in October, and Alexander Payne's comedy Downsizing, which was released in December. In 2019, Damon portrayed Carroll Shelby in the action biographical drama Ford v Ferrari, directed by James Mangold.

In 2021, Damon starred in Tom McCarthy's crime drama Stillwater. In the film Damon stars as an unemployed oil-rig worker from Oklahoma who sets out with a French woman to prove his convicted daughter's innocence. The film costars Abigail Breslin, and Camille Cottin. The film had its world premiere at the Cannes Film Festival on July 8, 2021, where it received positive reviews. IndieWire praised Damon's performance writing, "Damon’s performance is graced with a quiet softness that offsets the sheer volume of the character he’s playing". That same year he released the historical drama The Last Duel which he stars and co-wrote alongside Ben Affleck. The film set in medieval France based on the book of the same name focuses on the true story of a knight, Jean de Carrouges, portrayed by Damon, who challenges his former friend, squire Jacques Le Gris to a judicial duel after he's accused of raping his wife Marguerite. Adam Driver stars as Le Gris, and Comer stars as his wife. Affleck also stars in a supporting role as Count Pierre d'Alençon. The film premiered at the 78th Venice International Film Festival. The film earned positive reviews despite being a financial failure of the box office.

Upcoming projects 
In 2021, it was confirmed that Damon would reunite with director Christopher Nolan after a cameo in Interstellar, for Nolan's upcoming biographical film Oppenheimer. He will be playing Leslie Groves, the director of the Manhattan Project. In 2022, he was set to star in Air, a feature film based on the life of former Nike executive Sonny Vaccaro, co-starring and directed by Ben Affleck.

Activism 

Damon, alongside George Clooney, Brad Pitt, Don Cheadle, David Pressman, and Jerry Weintraub, is one of the founders of Not On Our Watch Project, an organization that focuses global attention and resources to stop and prevent mass atrocities such as in Darfur. Damon supports One Campaign, which is aimed at fighting AIDS and poverty in Third World countries. He has appeared in their print and television advertising. He is an ambassador for ONEXONE, a nonprofit foundation committed to supporting, preserving, and improving the lives of children at home in Canada, the United States, and around the world.

Damon is a spokesperson for Feeding America, a hunger-relief organization, and a member of their Entertainment Council, participating in their Ad Council public service announcements. He is a board member of Tonic Mailstopper (formerly GreenDimes), a company that attempts to halt junk mail delivered to American homes each day.

Damon was the founder of the H2O Africa Foundation, the charitable arm of the Running the Sahara expedition, which merged with WaterPartners to create Water.org in July 2009.

Water.org has partnered with corporate sponsors to promote awareness and raise funds to support its mission of bringing safe, clean, cost-effective drinking water and sanitation to developing countries. In this context, Damon has been the face of advertising campaigns to promote Water.org in conjunction with products from major sponsors.

In October 2011, Water.org received an $8 million grant from the PepsiCo Foundation to scale up WaterCredit, which provides microloans to families throughout India. Damon has been part of promoting those efforts, tying in with the Aquafina and Ethos Water brands of bottled water owned by PepsiCo and Starbucks.

Since 2015, Damon has promoted Anheuser-Busch InBev's Stella Artois beer brand as a Water.org partner, including the sale of limited-edition "blue chalice" glasses imprinted with an embellished blue version of the brand's logo. In a television advertisement made for broadcast during the 2018 Super Bowl of the United States' National Football League (NFL), he promoted Water.org and Stella Artois's role in supporting its work.

In October 2021, he announced a new partnership with the cryptocurrency trading platform Crypto.com, under which Crypto.com was to make a $1 million donation to Water.org. In the announcement, Damon said, "Crypto.com gave us this great donation, which is amazing. The money that I make for the commercials to promote them, I give 100% of that to Water.org as well. So, it's millions of dollars coming in to us."

Damon's Crypto.com commercial started rolling out in cinemas late in 2021, and then on television in January 2022, mainly during sports programming such as NFL games. Once it was broadcast widely on television, it sparked much criticism, as did its accompanying "making of" featurette. 
In The Independent, Nathan Place wrote, "Twitter is cringing after a TV commercial starring Matt Damon compared trading cryptocurrency to mankind's greatest achievements. In the ad, which aired during Sunday night’s NFL games, Mr Damon makes an abstract plug for crypto.com – a platform for exchanging digital currencies like Bitcoin – while striding past images of explorers and astronauts. The New Zealand Herald published an article by Lexie Cartwright summing up viewer reaction: "Matt Damon's new commercial plugging cryptocurrency has been absolutely savaged on social media, with viewers dubbing it 'insulting' and 'disgusting'." The story included a series of tweets, among them one by Carole Cadwalladr of The Observer in which she wrote, "There isn't enough yuck in the world to describe Matt Damon advertising a Ponzi scheme and comparing it to the moon landings." In the New York Post, Ben Cost wrote, "Matt Damon has been blasted online after appearing in a 'cringe-worthy' Crypto.com commercial that analogizes buying cryptocurrency to some of history's greatest achievements. The advert originally aired in October, but is currently going viral as critics torch its pretentious message." He described Damon's advertisement as "shameless crypto-shilling".

Public image 
Comedian Jimmy Kimmel has a running gag on his ABC television show, Jimmy Kimmel Live!, where he apologizes for not being able to interview Damon at the end of each show. It culminated in a planned skit on September 12, 2006, when Damon stormed off after having his interview cut short. Damon appeared in several of E! Entertainment's top ten Jimmy Kimmel Live! spoofs. On January 24, 2013, Damon took over his show and mentioned the long-standing feud and having been bumped from years of shows. It involved celebrities who were previously involved in the "feud", including Robin Williams, Ben Affleck, and Sarah Silverman.

Personal life 

Damon met his Argentine wife, Luciana Bozán, while filming Stuck on You in Miami in April 2003. They became engaged in September 2005 and married in a private civil ceremony at the Manhattan Marriage Bureau on December 9, 2005. They have three daughters together born in June 2006, August 2008, and October 2010. He also has a stepdaughter Alexia Barroso (born 1998) from Bozán's previous marriage, and considers her to be his own. 

The couple has lived in Miami and New York City; and since 2012, they have lived in the Pacific Palisades neighborhood of Los Angeles.

In 2018, Damon bought a luxury penthouse in New York City's Brooklyn Heights neighborhood for $16.5 million, making it Brooklyn's most expensive apartment at the time. He is a fan of the Boston Red Sox. After the team won the 2007 World Series, he narrated the commemorative DVD release of the event. He has competed in several World Series of Poker (WSOP) events, including the 2010 World Series of Poker main event. He was eliminated from the 1998 WSOP by poker professional Doyle Brunson.

Politics 
While discussing the Iraq War on Hardball with Chris Matthews in December 2006, Damon expressed concern about inequities across socioeconomic classes with regard to who is tasked with the responsibility of fighting wars.

Damon is a supporter of the Democratic Party, and has made several critical attacks against Republican Party figures. However, he also expressed disappointment over the policies of President Barack Obama. He had a working relationship with the Obama administration, primarily due to his friendship with Jason Furman, his former Harvard roommate who became Chairman of the Council of Economic Advisors to Obama.

In 2010, Damon narrated the documentary film Inside Job, about the part played by financial deregulation in the late-2000s financial crisis.

In 2012, Damon joined Ben Affleck and John Krasinski in hosting a fundraiser for Democratic Senate nominee Elizabeth Warren.

Damon endorsed Hillary Clinton in the 2016 presidential election.

Social views 

In October and December 2017, Damon made headlines when he made a series of comments regarding the Me Too movement against sexual harassment and misconduct. On October 10, Sharon Waxman, a former reporter for The New York Times, mentioned that Damon and Russell Crowe had made direct phone calls to her to vouch for the head of Miramax Italy, Fabrizio Lombardo. In her report, she suspected Lombardo of facilitating incidents of Harvey Weinstein's sexual misconduct in Europe. However, Damon clarified later that the calls were solely to reassure her of Lombardo's professional qualifications in the film industry. Waxman endorsed Damon's statement on Twitter hours later. Also during this time, Damon said that he had heard a story from Ben Affleck that Gwyneth Paltrow, a co-worker on a feature film of his, had been harassed by Weinstein in 1996, but thought "she had handled it" because they continued to work together, and Weinstein "treated her incredibly respectfully".

In another series of interviews during December 2017, Damon advocated for a "spectrum of behavior" analysis of sexual misconduct cases, noting that some are more serious than others. The comment caused offense to prominent members of the Me Too movement and the public for being "tone-deaf in understand[ing] what abuse is like". On January 17, 2018, Damon apologized on The Today Show for his social commentary, stating that he "should get in the back seat and close [his] mouth for a while".

In March 2018, Damon and Affleck announced they would adopt the inclusion rider agreement in all their future production deals through their company Pearl Street Films.

In August 2021, Damon sparked controversy after stating in an interview with The Sunday Times that he had only "months ago" stopped using the word "fag", saying that it "was commonly used when I was a kid, with a different application." This had come after an incident in which his daughter left the table due to his usage of the word and "wrote a very long, beautiful treatise on how that word is dangerous." He denied ever using the six-letter word "faggot" in his "personal life"; and went on to state, in regard to the word "fag", "I explained that that word was used constantly and casually and was even a line of dialogue in a movie of mine as recently as 2003; she in turn expressed incredulity that there could ever have been a time where that word was used unthinkingly. To my admiration and pride, she was extremely articulate about the extent to which that word would have been painful to someone in the LGBTQ+ community regardless of how culturally normalized it was. I not only agreed with her but thrilled at her passion, values and desire for social justice."

Awards and honors 

Aside from awards he has garnered for his role as an actor and producer, Damon became the 2,343rd person to receive a star on the Hollywood Walk of Fame on July 25, 2007. He reacted to the award by stating: "A few times in my life, I've had these experiences that are just kind of too big to process and this looks like it's going to be one of those times."

Notes

References

Further reading 
 Altman, Sheryl and Berk, Sheryl. Matt Damon and Ben Affleck: On and Off Screen. HarperCollins Publishers, 1998. .
 Bego, Mark. Matt Damon: Chasing a Dream. Andrews Mcmeel Pub, 1998. .
 Diamond, Maxine and Hemmings, Harriet. Matt Damon a Biography. Simon Spotlight Entertainment, 1998. .
 Nickson, Chris. Matt Damon: An Unauthorized Biography. Renaissance Books, 1999. .

External links 

 
 

 
1970 births
Living people
20th-century American male actors
21st-century American male actors
American film producers
American humanitarians
American male film actors
American male screenwriters
American male television actors
American male voice actors
American people of English descent
American people of Finnish descent
American people of Scottish descent
American people of Swedish descent
American philanthropists
Best Musical or Comedy Actor Golden Globe (film) winners
Best Original Screenplay Academy Award winners
Best Screenplay Golden Globe winners
Cambridge Rindge and Latin School alumni
Harvard University alumni
Male actors from Boston
Male actors from Cambridge, Massachusetts
Massachusetts Democrats
People associated with cryptocurrency
People from Brooklyn Heights
People from Pacific Palisades, California
Screenwriters from Massachusetts
Spokespersons
Television producers from Massachusetts
Writers from Boston
Writers from Cambridge, Massachusetts